Mumbi Macharia is a Kenyan performing spoken-word poet and writer.

Career 
Mumbi began Spoken Word poetry in 2016 performing at Kwani? Open Mic, PAL (Poetry After Lunch) at the Kenya Cultural Center, and Slam Africa.

Mumbi has been a guest at various media stations in Kenya, i.e. KTN Life&Style, NTV The Trend, Living with Ess and Citizen TV 10 over 10.

In 2020 Mumbi was interviewed on CNN One World to discuss a poem she wrote titled "Dear World Leaders". She has written for organizations such as PMNCH, mothers2mothers, and Multichoice.

Awards & nominations 
(2016) Runners up, Slam Africa

(2018) Nominee, Sondeka Awards, Best Spoken Word Artist

(2018) Poetry After Lunch Recognition Award

(2019) Nominee, Cafe Ngoma Awards, Spoken Word Poet of the Year

(2020) Winner, Sondeka Awards Best Spoken Word Poet

(2022) Winner, Sondeka Awards Best Spoken Word Poet

References

External links 
https://www.youtube.com/channel/UCVjlz8qqXs00MXnVHsAp-cg?view_as=public
 https://www.instagram.com/mumbipoetry/
 https://www.instagram.com/mumbipoetry
 https://www.facebook.com/mumbispokenword/

Living people
1997 births
Kenyan poets
Kenyan women poets
Spoken word poets